The Kuantan River is a river in Pahang, Malaysia. It runs from Sungai Lembing through Kuantan City before flowing out to South China Sea.

One section of the Kuantan River flows past an ancient mangrove forest. This forest, which has existed for 500 years, is of vital importance and immense value for the many animal and bird species that it supports as well as for the ecology of the area. The swamp sprawls over an area of 340 hectares.

See also
 List of rivers of Malaysia

References

Gallery

Rivers of Pahang
Rivers of Malaysia